Miki Satō may refer to:

, Japanese actress
, Japanese musician
, Japanese television personality